Maxillary means "related to the maxilla (upper jaw bone)". Terms containing "maxillary" include:

Maxillary artery
Maxillary nerve
Maxillary prominence
Maxillary sinus